Baron Tweedmouth, of Edington in the County of Berwick, was a title in the Peerage of the United Kingdom. It was created in 1881 for the businessman and Liberal politician Sir Dudley Marjoribanks, 1st Baronet. He had already been created a baronet, of Guisachan in Beaulieu in the County of Inverness, in the Baronetage of the United Kingdom 1866. He was succeeded by his son, the second Baron. He was also a Liberal politician and notably served as First Lord of the Admiralty between 1905 and 1908. The title became extinct on the death of his son, the third Baron, in 1935. He is also the creator of the Golden Retriever

The heir presumptive for the 3rd Baron was the Conservative MP Edward Marjoribanks. However he committed suicide in 1932.

Ishbel Hamilton-Gordon, Marchioness of Aberdeen and Temair, was the daughter of the first Baron.

Barons Tweedmouth (1881)
Dudley Coutts Marjoribanks, 1st Baron Tweedmouth (1820–1894) 
Edward Marjoribanks, 2nd Baron Tweedmouth (1849–1909)
Dudley Churchill Marjoribanks, 3rd Baron Tweedmouth (1874–1935)

References

Extinct baronies in the Peerage of the United Kingdom
Noble titles created in 1881
Noble titles created for UK MPs
1881 establishments in the United Kingdom